Nyalam is a small town in and the county seat of Nyalam County in the Shigatse Prefecture of the Tibet Autonomous Region, near the Nepal border. It is 35 km from Zhangmu town in the same county, which is the point of entry to Nepal. Nyalam is situated at 3,750 metres (12,300 ft) above sea level.

Once a town of stone buildings and tin roofs, Nyalam was known as Tsongdu and was part of the historical Tsang Province of  Tibet before the annexation by China. Nepalese trans-himalayan traders called it Kuti and also 'The Gate of Hell' because the old trail down to the Nepalese border was very treacherous.

Today Nyalam is a fast-growing little town made of concrete buildings located on the Friendship Highway between Lhasa and the Nepal border.  South of Nyalam the road drops abruptly through the gorge of the Matsang Tsangpo ( Poiqu, Bhotekoshi River), which is the upper section or main tributary of Sun Kosi in Nepal.  The town is about 40 km from the  Nepalese border and 150 km from Kathmandu.

See also
 Milarepa's Cave, Nyalam
 China National Highway 318
 Friendship Highway

Footnotes

References
Dowman, Keith. (1988). The Power-places of Central Tibet: The Pilgrim's Guide, pp. 73–79. Routledge & Kegan Paul. London. 
Gyume Dorje. (1999). Footprint Tibet Handbook with Bhutan. Footprint Handbooks, Bath, England. .
Mayhew, Bradley and Kohn, Michael. (2005). Tibet, 6th Edition. Lonely Planet. .

External links 

 Nyalam and Zhangmu photos
 More Nyalam and Zhangmu photos

Populated places in Shigatse
Township-level divisions of Tibet
Nyalam County